Roberto "Spider" Traven (born September 16, 1968) is a retired Brazilian mixed martial artist whose fighting style is based in Brazilian Jiu-Jitsu and submission wrestling. He was a sporty person growing up, it took him 16 years to find Brazilian Jiu Jitsu, but straight away he picked up tuition with one of the most highly decorated coaches of all time, Romero Cavalcanti AKA “Jacaré”.  His natural ability for BJJ was clear from the get-go and the fact that he was obstinate made a recipe for a good fighter. Training 3 times per day alongside other historical figures such as Fabio Gurgel, Leo Vieira, Jamelão and many others, Traven managed to reach the grade of black belt within 4 years, an almost record breaking time frame in BJJ.

Traven started coaching at the “Academia Strike”, and soon pulled out one of his students, Muzio de Angelis, to help him with the classes. The team grew strong, but the venue ended closing in 1997. Roberto Traven did not give up and he re-opened his academy, this time making his former student, Muzio,  his associate naming the team “Academia Muzio & Traven”.

Having started his MMA career in the United States in 1996 UFC 11 vs. Dave Berry and in UFC 34 vs. Frank Mir, Roberto Traven started seeing more and more of US territory as the years went by. Understanding that America had a great potential for jiu-jitsu, Roberto decided to leave the “Muzio & Traven” partnership a few years after he began it, and moved for long term to the US.

Though his once promising MMA career died down after the turn of the millennium, due to a series of losses, Traven’s career as a BJJ instructor blossomed with several students, having also graduated some of the American students with the grade of black belt.

Traven is currently sponsored by UK Jiu Jitsu apparel company, AESTHETIC.

Roberto Traven BJJ are multiple time IBJFF Atlanta International Open Champions & 2016 Atlanta BJJ Pro Champions.

Titles
First Place - Brazilian National Championship - 1995
First Place - Brazilian Team Championship - 1995
First Place - Brazilian Team Championship – 1996
First Place - AFC Russia Ultimate Fighting – 1997
First Place - World Jiu-Jitsu Championship – 1998
First Place - open class in the ADCC Submission Wrestling World Championship (grappling) – 1999
First Place - Brazilian Team Championship – 1999
First Place - World Jiu-Jitsu Championship – 1999
First Place - Rings Japan – 2000
Second Place - Super fight in the ADCC Submission Wrestling World Championship (grappling) – 2000
Second Place - Masters World Championship– 2002
First Place - Master's World Cup super heavy-weight – 2002
First Place - Master's World Cup open class – 2002
First Place - Master's World Cup heavy weight – 2003
First Place - Pan Ams open and super heavy weight division (class Senior I) - 2006
First Place - Pan American Senior II Heavy Weight division - 2010
Third Place - ADCC Trials New Jersey Adult division - 2011
First Place -  World Master Jiu-Jitsu IBJJF Championship Heavy Weight Division (class Master IV) - 2014
First Place - Pan Ams open and super heavy weight division (class Master IV) - 2015
First Place -  World Master Jiu-Jitsu IBJJF Championship Heavy Weight Division (class Master IV) - 2016

Mixed martial arts record

|-
| Loss
| align=center| 6–4–1
| John Salter
| KO (punches)
| Adrenaline MMA 3
| 
| align=center| 1
| align=center| 2:15
| Birmingham, Alabama, United States
| 
|-
| Draw
| align=center| 6–3–1
| Yukiya Naito
| Draw
| Warriors Realm 3
| 
| align=center| 3
| align=center| 5:00
| Brisbane, Australia
| 
|-
| Loss
| align=center| 6–3
| Elvis Sinosic
| KO (punch)
| Warriors Realm 1
| 
| align=center| 2
| align=center| 0:35
| Queensland, Australia
| 
|-
| Loss
| align=center| 6–2
| Frank Mir
| Submission (armbar)
| UFC 34
| 
| align=center| 1
| align=center| 1:05
| Las Vegas, Nevada
| 
|-
| Loss
| align=center| 6–1
| Dave Menne
| Decision (unanimous)
| Rings: King of Kings 2000 Block A
| 
| align=center| 3
| align=center| 5:00
| Tokyo, Japan
| 
|-
| Win
| align=center| 6–0
| Mikhail Borissov
| Decision (unanimous)
| Rings: King of Kings 2000 Block A
| 
| align=center| 2
| align=center| 5:00
| Tokyo, Japan
| 
|-
| Win
| align=center| 5–0
| Gueorguiev Tzvetkov
| Decision (majority)
| Rings: Millennium Combine 2
| 
| align=center| 2
| align=center| 5:00
| Tokyo, Japan
| 
|-
| Win
| align=center| 4–0
| Maxim Tarasov
| Submission (rear-naked choke)
| Absolute Fighting Championship 2
| 
| align=center| 1
| align=center| 2:47
| Moscow, Russia
| Won IAFC 2 Day 1 Tournament
|-
| Win
| align=center| 3–0
| Leonid Efremov
| TKO (submission to punches)
| Absolute Fighting Championship 2
| 
| align=center| 1
| align=center| 2:54
| Moscow, Russia
| 
|-
| Win
| align=center| 2–0
| Artyom Vilgulevsky
| Submission (rear-naked choke)
| Absolute Fighting Championship 2
| 
| align=center| 1
| align=center| 2:28
| Moscow, Russia
| 
|-
| Win
| align=center| 1–0
| Dave Berry
| TKO (submission to strikes)
| UFC 11
| 
| align=center| 1
| align=center| 1:23
| Augusta, Georgia, United States
|

Grappling record

References 

 International Federation of Brazilian Jiu-Jitsu. World Championship, Results. ibjjf.com. URL last accessed April 21, 2007.
 Ultimate Fighting Championship. UFC Home Page, Past UFC Events. URL last accessed April 21, 2007.

External links
 
 
 BJJ Heroes: Roberto Traven
 Official Website
 Website of Traven's training facility, "Unit 2 Fitness"
 French academy Roberto Traven / Muzio de Angelis

Brazilian practitioners of Brazilian jiu-jitsu
People awarded a black belt in Brazilian jiu-jitsu
Brazilian male mixed martial artists
Middleweight mixed martial artists
Mixed martial artists utilizing Brazilian jiu-jitsu
Brazilian expatriate sportspeople in the United States
Living people
1968 births
Ultimate Fighting Championship male fighters
World Brazilian Jiu-Jitsu Championship medalists
Sportspeople from Rio de Janeiro (city)